The Sanremo Music Festival 1991 was the 41st annual Sanremo Music Festival, held at the Teatro Ariston in Sanremo, province of Imperia, between 27 February and 2 March 1991 and broadcast on Rai 1.

The show was presented by actors Andrea Occhipinti and Edwige Fenech. Adriano Aragozzini served as artistic director.

The winner of the Big Artists section was Riccardo Cocciante with the song "Se stiamo insieme", while Enzo Jannacci won the critics award with the song "La fotografia". Paolo Vallesi won the "Newcomers" section with the song "Le persone inutili".

According to the rules of this edition, each song of the big artist section was presented  in a double performance by a non-Italian singer or group, and adapted in their foreign language.

Participants and results

Big Artists

Newcomers

References 

 

Sanremo Music Festival by year
1991 music festivals
1991 in Italian music 
1991 in Italian television